Yu Tomidokoro (富所 悠, born April 21, 1990) is a Japanese football player for FC Ryūkyū.

Club statistics
Updated to end of 2018 season.

References

External links
Profile at FC Ryukyu

"登録選手一覧表" . J.League. February 24, 2016.

1990 births
Living people
Association football people from Saitama Prefecture
Japanese footballers
J2 League players
J3 League players
Japan Football League players
Tokyo Verdy players
AC Nagano Parceiro players
FC Ryukyu players
Association football midfielders